Almira is the first opera by George Frideric Handel, about and named after a fictitious Castilian queen in Valladolid.

Almira may also refer to :

Places 
 Almira, Ontario, Canada, a neighbourhood in Markham
 Almira Township, Michigan, US, a civil township
 Almira, Washington, US, a town

People

Given name 
 Almira Cercado, a member of the Filipino girl group 4th Impact
 Almira Edson (1803–1886), American folk artist
 Almira Hershey (1843–1930), American civic leader, businesswoman, property developer, hotelier and philanthropist
 Almira Hart Lincoln Phelps (1793-1884), American educator, author, editor
 Almira Hollander Pitman (1854–1939), American suffragist and women's rights activist
 Almira Sessions (1888–1974), American character actress of stage, screen and television
 Almira Skripchenko, Moldovian-born French chess player

Surname 
 Jacques Almira (born Jacques Schaetzle, 1950), French writer

Other uses 
 Almira College, a women's college, forerunner of Greenville University, Greenville, Illinois, US
 Miss Almira Gulch, a villain in the 1939 film The Wizard of Oz

See also 

 Almyros, an ancient city in Thessalia, Greece
 Elmira (disambiguation)
 Almir (given name)